Caroline "KK" Clark (born June 28, 1990) is an American female water polo player from Menlo Park, California. She was part of the American team at the 2013 World Aquatics Championships in Barcelona, Spain and the 2016 Summer Olympics in Rio de Janeiro.

See also
 United States women's Olympic water polo team records and statistics
 List of Olympic champions in women's water polo
 List of Olympic medalists in water polo (women)

References

External links
 

1990 births
Living people
Sportspeople from Palo Alto, California
American female water polo players
Water polo centre backs
Water polo players at the 2016 Summer Olympics
Medalists at the 2016 Summer Olympics
Olympic gold medalists for the United States in water polo
Water polo players at the 2015 Pan American Games
Pan American Games medalists in water polo
Pan American Games gold medalists for the United States
Universiade medalists in water polo
Universiade silver medalists for the United States
Medalists at the 2011 Summer Universiade
Medalists at the 2015 Pan American Games
21st-century American women